Szczurowa  is a village in Brzesko County, Lesser Poland Voivodeship, in southern Poland. It is the seat of the gmina (administrative district) called Gmina Szczurowa.

The village has a population of 1,800.

People 
 Jan Piotrowski (b. 1953), Roman catholic bishop

See also
Szczurowa massacre

References

Szczurowa
Kraków Voivodeship (1919–1939)